Ivan Bošković (Cyrillic: Иван Бошковић, born 1 January 1982) is a Montenegrin football coach and former football player.

Club career
Born in Podgorica, then part of SR Montenegro, SFR Yugoslavia, he begin his career in his hometown club FK Iskra Danilovgrad. 1999 he moved to FK Sutjeska Nikšić which was a regular top flight side at that time. In summer 2004 he moved to their biggest Montenegrin rivals, FK Budućnost Podgorica, also playing back then in the First League of Serbia and Montenegro. In January 2005, during the winter break, he moved to France and joined Ligue 2 side SCO Angers, where he played the rest of the season before returning to Budućnost in the following summer.

In summer 2006 the leagues of Serbia and Montenegro separated and Ivan Bošković left Budućnost and moved to Serbia to play in the SuperLiga, first with FK Vojvodina during the 2006–07 seasons, and next with FK Borac Čačak during the 2007–08 season.

In summer 2008 he returns to Montenegro and signs with a First League side OFK Grbalj where he will play during the following three seasons and become the league top-scorer in 2010 with 28 goals. In 2011, he moved to Uzbekistan and joined Nasaf Qarshi where he won 2011 AFC Cup and become top scorer of 2011 AFC Cup with 10 goals. Nickname is - "Boskogoal" and "Boshdagol".

References

External links
 Profile and stats until 2003 at Dekisa.Tripod.

1982 births
Living people
Footballers from Nikšić
Association football forwards
Serbia and Montenegro footballers
Serbia and Montenegro under-21 international footballers
Montenegrin footballers
FK Sutjeska Nikšić players
FK Budućnost Podgorica players
Angers SCO players
FK Vojvodina players
FK Borac Čačak players
OFK Grbalj players
FC Nasaf players
Ivan Boskovic
Ivan Boskovic
Ivan Boskovic
Ivan Boskovic
Ivan Boskovic
Ivan Boskovic
Ivan Boskovic
AFC Cup winning players
First League of Serbia and Montenegro players
Championnat National players
Serbian SuperLiga players
Montenegrin First League players
Uzbekistan Super League players
Ivan Boskovic
Serbia and Montenegro expatriate footballers
Expatriate footballers in France
Serbia and Montenegro expatriate sportspeople in France
Montenegrin expatriate footballers
Expatriate footballers in Serbia
Montenegrin expatriate sportspeople in Serbia
Expatriate footballers in Uzbekistan
Montenegrin expatriate sportspeople in Uzbekistan
Expatriate footballers in Thailand
Montenegrin expatriate sportspeople in Thailand